New Bedford is a city in the U.S. state of Massachusetts.

New Bedford may also refer to:

Places

New Bedford, Illinois
Relating to New Bedford, Massachusetts:
New Bedford Whaling National Historical Park
New Bedford, New Jersey	
New Bedford, Ohio
New Bedford, Pennsylvania

Events

 1928 New Bedford Textile Strike

Ships
 , more than one United States Navy ship